Aldar Balzhinimaev (born August 9, 1993) is a Russian wrestler who participated at the 2010 Summer Youth Olympics in Singapore. He won the gold medal in the boys' freestyle 46 kg event, defeating Mehran Sheikhi of Iran in the final.

Balzhinimaev was born in Kizhinga, Buryatia.

References 

1993 births
Living people
People from Buryatia
Wrestlers at the 2010 Summer Youth Olympics
Russian male sport wrestlers
Youth Olympic gold medalists for Russia
Sportspeople from Buryatia
21st-century Russian people